Bastiaan Franciscus Wilhelmus de Leede (born 15 November 1999) is a Dutch cricketer. His father, Tim de Leede, played in 29 One Day Internationals (ODIs) for the Netherlands.

Career
He made his List A debut for Royal Netherlands Cricket Board XI (KNCB XI) during the Netherlands tour of Zimbabwe on 29 September 2017. He made his first-class debut for the Netherlands against Namibia in the 2015–17 ICC Intercontinental Cup on 29 November 2017.

In February 2018, he was added to the Netherlands squad for the 2018 Cricket World Cup Qualifier, after Stephan Myburgh was ruled out of the tournament due to an injury. In June 2018, he was named in the Netherlands' Twenty20 International (T20I) squad for the 2018 Netherlands Tri-Nation Series.

He made his T20I debut for the Netherlands against Ireland on 12 June 2018. In July 2018, he was named in the Netherlands' One Day International (ODI) squad, for their series against Nepal. He made his ODI debut for the Netherlands against Nepal on 1 August 2018.

In July 2019, he was selected to play for the Rotterdam Rhinos in the inaugural edition of the Euro T20 Slam cricket tournament. However, the following month the tournament was cancelled.

In September 2021, de Leede was named in the Dutch squad for the 2021 ICC Men's T20 World Cup.

In August 2022, it was announced that de Leede would be playing for  the MI Emirates team in the new ILT20 competition.

References

External links
 

1999 births
Living people
Dutch cricketers
Netherlands One Day International cricketers
Netherlands Twenty20 International cricketers
Sportspeople from South Holland
21st-century Dutch people